HMS Monmouth was the name ship of her class of 10 armoured cruisers built for the Royal Navy in the first decade of the 20th century. The ships were also known as the County Cruisers (each being named after a British county).

She was assigned to the 1st Cruiser Squadron of the Channel Fleet upon completion in 1903. She was transferred to the China Station in 1906, and remained there until she returned home in 1913 and was assigned to the reserve Third Fleet. When World War I began in August 1914, the ship was recommissioned and assigned to the 5th Cruiser Squadron in the Central Atlantic to search for German commerce raiders and protect Allied shipping. She was detached upon arrival to patrol the Brazilian coast for German ships, and was later ordered to the South Atlantic to join Rear Admiral Christopher Cradock's squadron in their search for the German East Asia Squadron. He found the German squadron on 1 November off the coast of Chile. The German squadron outnumbered Cradock's force and were individually more powerful; they sank Cradock's two armoured cruisers in the Battle of Coronel. Monmouth was lost with all hands.

Design and description
The ships were designed to displace . They were powered by two 4-cylinder triple-expansion steam engines, each driving one shaft using steam provided by 31 Belleville boilers. Monmouth, however, was one of three of the ships of the class that failed to meet their designed speed.

The Monmouth-class ships' main armament consisted of fourteen breech-loading (BL)  Mk VII guns. Four of these guns were mounted in two twin-gun turrets, one each fore and aft of the superstructure, and the others were positioned in casemates amidships. Six of these were mounted on the main deck and were only usable in calm weather. Ten quick-firing (QF) 12-pounder 12-cwt guns were fitted for defence against torpedo boats. Monmouth also carried three 3-pounder  Hotchkiss guns and two submerged 18-inch (450 mm) torpedo tubes.
 
The armour of the gun turrets, their barbettes and the casemates was four inches thick.

Construction and service

Monmouth, named for the Welsh county, was laid down by London and Glasgow Shipbuilding at their shipyard in Govan on 29 August 1899, and launched on 13 November 1901. Her completion was delayed due to a collision with the liner Assyria in Glasgow harbour in late March 1902. She arrived at Devonport in late August that year for trials, but was not finally completed and accepted until 2 December 1903, when she was initially assigned to the 1st Cruiser Squadron of the Channel Fleet. She was briefly placed in reserve in Devonport at the end of January 1906, before being recommissioned in April for service on the China Station. During 1913 Monmouth paid a courtesy visit to the German treaty port of Tsingtao on the Chinese Mainland. Later in the same year she returned home and was assigned to the reserve Third Fleet.

She was mobilised on 4 August with a crew that mostly consisted of reservists, and sent to the 5th Cruiser Squadron of Rear Admiral Archibald Stoddart on the Cape Verde – Canary Islands station. Upon her arrival on 13 August, Stoddart detached her to the Brazilian coast to search for the German light cruisers known to be in the area. She came under Cradock's command in mid-September. At the end of September, Cradock made his first fruitless search of the Tierra del Fuego area and later detached Monmouth and two other ships to search up the Chilean coast, reaching Valparaiso on 15 October, while his flagship,  returned to Port Stanley, in the Falkland Islands, to recoal and to reestablish communications with the Admiralty. He received word on 7 October that German Vice Admiral Spee's ships were definitely bound for the Cape Horn region and waited for the elderly predreadnought battleship  to reinforce his squadron. She was in poor mechanical condition when she arrived at Port Stanley and required time to make repairs. Good Hope sailed on 22 October without her, going around Cape Horn, while Canopus and three colliers departed the following day, taking the shorter route through the Strait of Magellan.

Battle of Coronel

Good Hope rendezvoused with the rest of the squadron at Vallenar Roads, in the remote Chonos Archipelago of Chile on 27 October to recoal. They departed two days later, just as Canopus arrived, Cradock ordering the battleship to follow as soon as possible. He sent the light cruiser  to scout ahead and to enter Coronel, Chile to pick up any messages from the Admiralty and acquire intelligence regarding German activities. The cruiser began to pick up German radio signals from the light cruiser  on the afternoon of 29 October, and delayed entering Coronel for two days with Cradock's permission to avoid being trapped by the fast German ships. A German supply ship was already there and radioed Spee that Glasgow had entered the harbour around twilight. The cruiser departed on the morning of 1 November, but Spee had already made plans to catch her when informed of her presence the previous evening.

Glasgow departed Coronel at 09:15 after having picked up the squadron's mail, and rendezvoused with the rest of the squadron four hours later. At 16:17 Leipzig spotted Glasgow, the easternmost British ship, to its west and she spotted Leipzigs funnel smoke three minutes later. At 17:10 Cradock ordered his ships to head for Glasgow, the closest ship to the Germans. The Force 7 winds and high seas, however, prevented the use of half of those guns as they were too close to the water. He also wanted to use the setting sun to his advantage so that its light would blind the German gunners. Spee was well aware of the British advantages and refused to allow Cradock to close the range. His ships were faster than the British, slowed by the 16-knot maximum speed of the armed merchant cruiser , and he opened up the range to  until conditions changed to suit him. The sun set at 18:50, which silhouetted the British ships against the light sky while the German ships became indistinguishable from the shoreline behind them.

Spee's flagship, Scharnhorst, engaged Good Hope while Gneisenau fired at Monmouth. The German shooting was very accurate, with both armoured cruisers quickly scoring hits on their British counterparts while still outside six-inch gun range, starting fires on both ships. Cradock, knowing his only chance was to close the range, continued to do so despite the battering that Spee's ships inflicted. By 19:23 the range was almost half of that when the battle began and the British ships bore onwards. One shell from Gneisenau blew the roof off Monmouths forward turret and started a fire, causing an ammunition explosion that completely blew the turret off the ship.
Severely damaged, Monmouth began to slow and veered out of line.

Glasgow broke contact with the German squadron at 20:05 and discovered Monmouth, listing and down by the bow, having extinguished her fires, 10 minutes later. She was trying to turn north to put her stern to the heavy northerly swell and was taking water at the bow. There was little that Glasgow could do to assist the larger ship as the moonlight illuminated both ships and the Germans were searching for them.

The light cruiser Nürnberg had been trailing the German squadron and spotted the plume of smoke from Glasgow at 20:35, and then saw Monmouth with a 10-degree list to port shortly afterwards. As Nürnberg closed the range, Monmouths list increased so that none of the guns on her port side could be used. The German cruiser closed to within  and illuminated her flag with its spotlight in the hopes that she would strike her colours and surrender. There was no response from the British ship and Nürnberg opened fire at 21:20, aiming high, but there was still no response. The German ship then fired a torpedo which missed and turned off its searchlight. Monmouth then increased speed and turned towards Nürnberg, which caused her to open fire again. Monmouth capsized at 21:58, taking her entire crew of 734 men with her as the seas were too rough to attempt any rescue effort.

Notes

Footnotes

Bibliography

External links

 Gravestone of James Forster Boulton in Horsham
 HMS Monmouth officers entertained by Prince Fushimi
  historic film

 

Monmouth-class cruisers
Ships built on the River Clyde
1901 ships
World War I cruisers of the United Kingdom
Maritime incidents in November 1914
Shipwrecks in the Chilean Sea
World War I shipwrecks in the Pacific Ocean
Warships lost in combat with all hands
Naval magazine explosions